Eddie Murray (born 10 July 1962) is an English footballer, who played as a winger in the Football League for Tranmere Rovers.

References

Tranmere Rovers F.C. players
Altrincham F.C. players
English Football League players
Association football wingers
Living people
1962 births
English footballers
People from Crosby, Merseyside